Stephen Ronald Quake (born 1969) is an American scientist, inventor and entrepreneur. He earned his B.S. in physics and M.S. in mathematics from Stanford in 1991 and his D.Phil. in physics from Oxford University in 1994 as a Marshall Scholar. His thesis research was in statistical mechanics and the effects of knots on polymers.  He did his postdoctoral work at Stanford in single-molecule biophysics with Steven Chu. Quake joined the faculty of the California Institute of Technology at the age of 26, where he rose through the ranks and was ultimately appointed the Thomas and Doris Everhart Professor of Applied Physics and Physics.  He moved back to Stanford University in 2005 to help launch a new department in Bioengineering, where he is now the Lee Otterson Professor of Bioengineering and Applied Physics. From 2006 to 2016 he was an Investigator of the Howard Hughes Medical Institute. He is an Andrew D. White Professor-at-Large at Cornell University.

Quake was elected a member of the National Academy of Engineering in 2013 for achievements in single-cell analysis and large-scale integration of microfluidic devices. He has also been elected to the National Academy of Sciences, the Institute of Medicine, the American Physical Society, the American Institute for Medical and Biological Engineering and the American Academy of Arts and Sciences. He is the recipient of numerous international awards, including the Human Frontiers of Science Nakasone Prize, the Jacob Heskel Gabbay Award (2015), the MIT-Lemelson Prize for Innovation, the Raymond and Beverly Sackler International Prize in Biophysics, the NIH Director’s Pioneer Award, the American Society of Microbiology’s Promega Biotechnology Award, and the Royal Society of Chemistry Publishing’s Pioneer of Miniaturization Award.  He has founded or co-founded several companies, including Fluidigm, Helicos Biosciences, Verinata Health, Quanticel Pharmaceuticals, Moleculo, Cellular Research and Immumetrix. Since October 2016, he has been leading as the co-president of Biohub.

Quake is known for his new approaches to biological measurement. He has made contributions to the field of microfluidics, including the invention of microfluidic large scale integration, and developed applications of microfluidics to structural biology, drug discovery, and molecular affinity measurements.  He has also made contributions to the field of genomics, including single molecule DNA sequencing, techniques to perform single cell gene expression and genome sequencing, the development of non-invasive prenatal diagnostics to replace amniocentesis, prenatal genome sequencing, non-invasive tests for heart transplant rejection, and the development of approaches to sequence and analyze an individual's immune system. His genome was the subject of clinical annotation by a large team in the Stanford Hospital. Quake is also known as a former academic adviser to He Jiankui, the controversial scientist who was involved with, purportedly, the first gene-edited babies.

References

External links
 Stephen Quake's group at Stanford University
 

Living people
1969 births
Stanford University alumni
Alumni of the University of Oxford
Stanford University School of Engineering faculty
Stanford University School of Medicine faculty
Howard Hughes Medical Investigators
American biophysicists
American bioengineers
Marshall Scholars
Members of the National Academy of Medicine